Bhima Jewellers is a jewellery retail company based in India. It was established by Bhima Bhattar in the year 1925. Bhima Jewellers were the first jewellery store to introduce ready made jewellery concept under the guidance of its founder Bhima Bhattar.

Bhima has its chain of branches spread across South India, including main branches at Chennai, Kottayam, Thirunelveli, Thiruvananthapuram, Kochi, Kozhikode, Bengaluru, Nagercoil and Madurai. After the death of founder Bhattar, the Bhima Group was managed by his five sons, Girirajan, Govindan, Krishnan, Bindumadhav and Lakshmikanthan, with each having separately managed headquarters and their own chain of branches. In 2012, Bhima announced a 2-year plan to expand its jewellery network by investing .

Products

Traditional Kerala designs, Tamil Nadu designs, Bengali heavy weight designs, Nellore colour Stone studded jewellery, Karwar precious Stone studded jewellery, diamond, platinum and silver jewellery

Awards
 
Bhima won several awards in the jewellery industry. Bhima has been retaining its position of highest sales tax paying jewellery showroom award in Kerala State for several years and also maintains top position  in the Grand Kerala Shopping Festival (GKSF), conducted by the Government of Kerala.

See also 
 Tribhovandas Bhimji Zaveri

References

External links 
 
 
 
 

Indian brands
Jewellery retailers of India
Retail companies established in 1925
Jewellery companies of India
Diamond dealers